Nogai may refer to:

 Nogai Khan, a de facto ruler of the Golden Horde
 Nogai Horde, a Turkic state which split from the Golden Horde in late 15th century
 Nogais, a Turkic people
 Nogai language, the language spoken by the Nogais
 Nogai steppe

Language and nationality disambiguation pages